Enteromius deguidei is a species of ray-finned fish in the genus Enteromius which has been recorded from a single location in the Democratic Republic of Congo (DRC).

The fish is named in honor of R. Deguide, of the Musée Royal de l’Afrique Centrale, for his assistance during Hubert Matthes’ research in the Ikela region of the DRC.

Footnotes 

 

Enteromius
Fish described in 1964
Taxa named by Hubert Matthes
Endemic fauna of the Democratic Republic of the Congo